The Broulee Island Nature Reserve is a protected nature reserve located on the south coast of New South Wales, Australia. The  reserve was created in 1972 and is managed by the NSW National Parks & Wildlife Service. In the twenties of the last century, there was a small port here from which a large amount of shellgrit was taken to Sydney, where they were made of lime and used in construction.

 a tombolo connected Broulee Island to the mainland at Broulee Head. Broulee Island Nature Reserve is located entirely in Eurobodalla Shire and within the boundaries of the Mogo Local Aboriginal Land Council.

Photo lovers here will enjoy views of the sea over the pristine stone pools, native plants, and the chance to catch a magnificent wren and a white-bellied sea eagle.

Gallery

See also

 Protected areas of New South Wales

References 

Nature reserves in New South Wales
Tombolos
Islands of New South Wales
South Coast (New South Wales)
Protected areas established in 1972
1972 establishments in Australia